Puerto Rico Highway 102 (PR-102) is a main highway in the southwestern portion of the Porta del Sol region of Puerto Rico. It begins at Puerto Rico Highway 2 north of central Mayagüez and runs through the municipalities of Cabo Rojo and San Germán, coming to an end in downtown Sabana Grande.

Route description

Mayagüez
PR-102 begins as a short two-lane road at an intersection with north of the Mar y Sol neighborhood. The road travels southwest down a relatively steep slope for approximately 0.23 miles where it comes to an intersection with the six-lane, north–south, arterial Avenida Comercio/PR-64 and the secondary, east–west, Calle Concordia/PR-3342. PR-102 replaces PR-64 southbound into where it runs through the Concordia Public Housing Complex until reaching a crossing at Yagüez River where it enters the industrial area immediately west of central Mayagüez. After crossing the Yagüez, the road decreases to four-lanes unofficially since there is an absence of pavement markings along this stretch. It is through this area that PR-102 has direct access to two of downtown Mayagüez's major streets Calle Méndez Vigo and Calle de la Candelaria, formerly McKinley Street. A half mile south of the river crossing, PR-102 enters a new traffic pattern and once again becomes a six-lane divided boulevard named Bulevar Guanajibo which travels directly adjacent to the numerous public housing complexes in the area. This area is currently under construction in preparation for hosting the 2010 Central American and Caribbean Games which includes the construction of two new stadiums and a waterfront promenade. Further south, after crossing the Guanajibo River, the route retains its name but once again becomes a two-lane road as it passes through Mayagüez's coastal neighborhoods.

Cabo Rojo
PR-102 continues to run south along the coastline where it enters Cabo Rojo, eventually passing through the seaside resort and fishing village of Joyuda. After leaving Joyuda, PR-102 curves eastward as Calle Pedro Albizu Campos. The highway intersects PR-100 just outside downtown Cabo Rojo. It enters the town as Calle Nuevo Carbonell and shares some of its length with PR-103 for a little over a half mile.

San Germán
Once exiting the town, the route travels a short distance through countryside until entering downtown San Germán as Calle Comercio Luna.

Sabana Grande
After leaving San Germán, the road once again travels through rural communities until it intersects PR-2 just outside downtown Sabana Grande. It enters Sabana Grande as Calle Francisco Mariano Quiñones, where it terminates south of the town plaza at the intersection of Calle 65 de Infanteria (65th Infantry Street)/PR-120 and PR-121 which continues along Francisco Mariano Quinon Street.

Major intersections

See also

 List of highways numbered 102

References

External links
 

102